Haddington and Lammermuir is one of the six wards used to elect members of the East Lothian Council. It elects four Councillors.

Councillors

Election Results

2019 By-Election

2017 Election
2017 East Lothian Council election

2012 Election
2012 East Lothian Council election

2007 Election
2007 East Lothian Council election

References

Wards of East Lothian
Haddington, East Lothian